The Chicago Cubs are a Major League Baseball franchise based in Chicago that plays in the National League Central division. In the history of the franchise, it has also played under the names Chicago White Stockings, Chicago Colts and Chicago Orphans. The first game of the new baseball season for a team is played on Opening Day, and being named the Opening Day starter is an honor, which is often given to the player who is expected to lead the pitching staff that season, though there are various strategic reasons why a team's best pitcher might not start on Opening Day. The Cubs have used 68 different starting pitchers on Opening Day since they first became a Major League team in 1876. The Cubs have a record of 74 wins, 60 losses and 2 ties in their Opening Day games.

The Cubs have played in seven different home ball parks.  They have played at their current home, Wrigley Field, since 1916.  They have a record of 22 wins, 21 losses and 1 tie in Opening Day games at Wrigley Field.  They had an Opening Day record of six wins, one loss and one tie at their other home ball parks, for a total home record in Opening Day games of 28 wins, 22 losses and 2 ties. Their record in Opening Day away games is 46 wins and 38 losses.

Ferguson Jenkins holds the Cubs record for most Opening Day starts with seven, in which his record was two wins, two losses and three no decisions. Carlos Zambrano has made six Opening Day starts. Larry Corcoran, Clark Griffith, Grover Cleveland Alexander, Charlie Root and Rick Sutcliffe have each made five Opening Day starts for the Cubs. Orval Overall, Lon Warneke, Bob Rush, Larry Jackson and Rick Reuschel each made four Opening Day starts for the Cubs, and Bill Hutchinson, Jon Lieber, Ray Burris, Claude Passeau, Jack Taylor and Hippo Vaughn each made three such starts.

Five Cubs' Opening Day starting pitchers have been inducted into the Baseball Hall of Fame: Griffith, Alexander, Jenkins, Al Spalding and John Clarkson.  In addition, 300–game winner Greg Maddux was the Cubs' Opening Day starting pitcher in 1992.  The Cubs have won the modern World Series championship three times,in 1907, 1908 and 2016.  Overall was the Cubs' Opening Day starting pitcher both seasons of 1907 and 1908 and the Cubs won both of those Opening Day games.  Don Cardwell was the Cubs' Opening Day starting pitcher against the Houston Colt .45s on April 10, 1962, the first game in Houston's history.  The Cubs lost the game by a score of 11–2.

Key

Pitchers

References
General

Specific

Opening day starters
Lists of Major League Baseball Opening Day starting pitchers